James Herbert Sherman is an American baseball coach and former outfielder and third baseman. He played college baseball at Delaware for coach Bob Hannah from 1979 to 1982 and played in the Houston Astros organization for 6 seasons from 1982 to 1987. He then served as the head coach of the Wilmington Wildcats (1988–1994) and the Delaware Fightin' Blue Hens (2001–2022).

Amateur career
Sherman attended William Penn High School in New Castle, Delaware. Sherman played for the school's varsity baseball and football teams. Sherman then enrolled at the University of Delaware, to play college baseball for the Delaware Fightin' Blue Hens baseball team.

As a freshman at the University of Delaware in 1979, Sherman had a .367 batting average, a .419 on-base percentage (OBP) and a .623 SLG. He was named to the first team All-East Coast Conference (ECC). As a sophomore in 1980, Sherman batted .328 with a .661 SLG, 13 home runs, and 56 RBIs. In the 1981 season as a junior, Sherman hit 10 home runs and 12 doubles, and was then selected by the Chicago Cubs in the 20th round of the 1981 Major League Baseball draft, but returned for his senior year at Delaware. Sherman had his best season as a senior in 1982, leading the team in doubles (13), home runs (15), RBIs (68), batting average (.394) and slugging (.794). He was named First Team All-ECC.

In 1980 and 1981 following his sophomore and junior seasons at Delaware, Sherman played collegiate summer baseball for the Chatham A's of the Cape Cod Baseball League (CCBL). Batting .339 and .335, he was named a league all-star in both seasons, and was inducted into the CCBL Hall of Fame in 2012.

Professional career
Sherman was drafted in the 14th round of the 1982 Major League Baseball draft by the Houston Astros.

Coaching career
Sherman was hired as the head coach of the Wilmington University Wildcats baseball program in 1988. He led the Wildcats to the NAIA World Series in 1992 and 1994. In the summer of 1994, Sherman was named an assistant coach at the University of Delaware. Sherman was elevated to head coach in 2000, following Bob Hannah's retirement. In May 2017, Sherman won his 500th career game at Delaware.

Head coaching record

References

External links

Delaware Fightin' Blue Hens bio

Living people
1960 births
Baseball outfielders
Baseball third basemen
Delaware Fightin' Blue Hens baseball players
Delaware Fightin' Blue Hens baseball coaches
Chatham Anglers players
Wilmington Wildcats baseball coaches
Gulf Coast Astros players
Asheville Tourists players
Columbus Astros players
Daytona Beach Astros players
Tucson Toros players
Boise Hawks players
People from New Castle, Delaware
Baseball coaches from Delaware